This is chronological list of action films split by decade. Often there may be considerable overlap particularly between action and other genres (including, horror, comedy, and science fiction films); the lists should attempt to document films which are more closely related to action, even if they bend genres.

Films by decade
 List of action films of the 1960s
 List of action films of the 1970s
 List of action films of the 1980s
 List of action films of the 1990s
 List of action films of the 2000s
 List of action films of the 2010s
 List of action films of the 2020s

See also
 Action films
 Martial arts films 
 Pirate film
 Swashbuckler films
 Superhero film